Hebeloma insigne is a species of mushroom in the family Hymenogastraceae. Along with other species of its genus, it is poisonous and can result in severe gastrointestinal upset.

References

insigne
Poisonous fungi